The following is an episode list for the American television sitcom Rude Awakening, which ran from August 1, 1998 until February 15, 2001. A total of 55 episodes were produced.

Series overview

Episodes

Season 1 (1998)

Season 2 (1999–2000)

Season 3 (2000–2001)

External links
 
 
 Rude Awakening at TVGuide.com
 Rude Awakening at Zap2it
  Rude Awakening at SeriesLive.com
  Rude Awakening at Fr.TVCircus.com
  Rude Awakening at Episotheque.com
 Rude Awakening Information and Episode Guide at TV.MSN.com
 Rude Awakening Information and Episode Guide at TV.Yahoo.com
 

Lists of American sitcom episodes

it:Episodi di Rude Awakening (terza stagione)